, abbreviated as , is a national university in Japan. The main campus (Shinagawa Campus) is located in Minato, Tokyo and another campus (Etchujima Campus) is in Kōtō, Tokyo.

History 

Tokyo University of Mercantile Marine 
In 1882 it became a national school named . In 1902 the school was removed from Reiganjima to present-day Etchujima Campus. In 1925 the school became .

In April 1945, during World War II, three nautical colleges at Tokyo, Kobe and Shimizu were merged into one college simply named Nautical College, which was located in Shimizu. In 1949 the college was developed into the University of Mercantile Marine under Japan's new educational system. In 1957 the university moved to Tokyo again and was renamed Tokyo University of Mercantile Marine.

Tokyo University of Fisheries 
It became a national school in 1897 and was renamed . The institute had been located in Etchujima next to Tokyo Nautical College till 1945, when the school buildings were occupied by US Army. The institute moved to Yokosuka in 1947 and was renamed the First Imperial Fisheries Institute, since the second fisheries institute was founded in Shimonoseki, Yamaguchi (the former colonial Pusan Fisheries College, now the National Fisheries University).

In 1949 the institute was developed into Tokyo University of Fisheries under Japan's new educational system. In 1957 the university moved to present-day Shinagawa Campus in Minato, Tokyo.

Undergraduate schools 

 Faculty of Marine Science (in Shinagawa Campus)
 Department of Ocean Sciences
 Department of Marine Biosciences
 Department of Food Science and Technology
 Department of Marine Policy and Culture
 Teacher Training Course for Fisheries High School  Education
 Faculty of Marine Technology (in Etchujima Campus)
 Department of Maritime Systems Engineering
 Department of Marine Electronics and Mechanical Engineering
 Department of Logistics and Information Engineering

Advanced courses 
 Advanced Course for Maritime Science and Technology
- a one-year course for the graduates of the Faculty of Marine Science
 Sea Training Course
- a half-year course for the graduates of the Faculty of Marine Technology

Graduate schools 
 Graduate School of Marine Science and Technology (Master's/Doctoral)

Academic rankings

References

External links 
 

Educational institutions established in 1875
Japanese national universities
Universities and colleges in Tokyo
Kōtō
Minato, Tokyo
1875 establishments in Japan